The 2001 Rally Australia (formally the 14th Telstra Rally Australia) was the thirteenth round of the 2001 World Rally Championship. The race was held over four days between 1 November and 4 November 2001, and was won by Peugeot's Marcus Grönholm, his 6th win in the World Rally Championship.

Background

Entry list

Itinerary
All dates and times are AWST (UTC+8).

Results

Overall

World Rally Cars

Classification

Special stages

Championship standings

FIA Cup for Production Rally Drivers

Classification

Special stages

Championship standings
Bold text indicates 2001 World Champions.

References

External links 
 Official website of the World Rally Championship

Australia
Rally Australia
Rally